Razorblade Suitcase is the second studio album by English rock band Bush, released on 19 November 1996 by Trauma and Interscope Records. The follow-up to their 1994 debut Sixteen Stone, it was recorded at Abbey Road Studios in London with engineer and producer Steve Albini. Its sound is more raw than that of its predecessor and has frequently been compared to Nirvana's In Utero (1993), which was also produced and engineered by Albini. The album is widely considered to be the last "grunge" sounding album of the 1990s.

Razorblade Suitcase debuted at number one on the US Billboard 200, selling 293,000 copies in its first week of sales in the United States. To date, it remains the only Bush album to top the Billboard 200. The twentieth anniversary of the album was marked with a reissue officially titled Razorblade Suitcase (In Addition) on 16 December 2016, including the remastered album and four rare bonus tracks: "Broken TV," "Old," "Sleeper" and "Bubbles."

Recording and production
Gavin Rossdale wrote most of the songs for Razorblade Suitcase in under one month. "Swallowed", along with others from the album were written while on the road. In an interview with Deseret News published on 2 January 1997, Rossdale explained:

"I was trying to write songs while my life was falling apart. While my longtime girlfriend of five years was leaving and packing in one room, I was writing in the other room."

The band chose Steve Albini to produce the album. In an interview with Spin during the final stages of the recording process Rossdale was quoted as saying that Albini "has been more important to me in terms of records I've listened to than any other person." Around the same time Albini declared that he put more time and energy into Razorblade Suitcase than he had with any previous albums.

Content

Musical style 
Illustrated to be a grunge album by Entertainment Weekly, Razorblade Suitcase invited strong comparisons to the music of Nirvana, whose final album In Utero had been produced by Albini in 1993. "Swallowed" and "Bonedriven" in particular conjured a description of "irresistibly reminiscent" of Nirvana. "Straight No Chaser" was opined by The A.V. Club to be the "sister ballad" to the band's earlier hit "Glycerine", while "Cold Contagious" invited comparisons to the work of Neil Young.

Lyrics 
Nicholas Slayton of Medium opined that the lyrics of Razorblade Suitcase "focused on three main ideas and problems"; being trapped in situations with no way out, fallout from relationships and loneliness. "Insect Kin" pertained to Rossdale's previous love interest Courtney Love, "History" was themed around abortion, while "Personal Holloway" reflected lament for societal norms forced on women. Gavin Rossdale commented in 2017 that the lead-single, "Swallowed", reflected "massive success after failing for years".

Promotion
In 1997, Bush embarked on a worldwide tour, the Razorblade Suitcase Tour, to promote the album. Stretching from late January into November of that year, it took the band through Europe, North America, South America, Asia, and Australia. It included stops at many major music festivals around the world, including Glastonbury Festival, Pinkpop Festival, Reading Festival, Rock am Ring, Rock im Park, and Pukkelpop.

Release and reception
Razorblade Suitcase was released on 19 November 1996, through Trauma Records. It debuted at number one on the Billboard 200, selling 293,000 copies in its first week. It remained at number one during its second week of release in the US. The album also debuted at number one in Canada, with first-week sales of 45,900 copies. Despite the album selling fewer copies than Sixteen Stone in the US, it marked a commercial peak for the band in their native Britain, where it reached number four on the UK Albums Chart.

The band originally planned to release the album in early 1997 but decided it would be better for a late 1996 release, especially considering that U2's next album was pushed into 1997.

The lead single from the album, "Swallowed", was released in October 1996 and was a huge success in the US, holding the number one spot on the US Billboard Modern Rock Tracks chart for 7 weeks. It remains the band's longest charting number one single. "Swallowed" also marked the commercial peak for the band in their native United Kingdom's singles charts, where it made number 7.

"Greedy Fly" was the second single released from Razorblade Suitcase and reached number three on the US Modern Rock Tracks chart. The singles "Swallowed" and "Greedy Fly" peaked at number seven and number twenty-two, respectively, on the UK Singles Chart.

"Bonedriven" and "Cold Contagious" followed as singles but did not make an impact on the charts.

"Mouth" was remixed and later released as a single from the band's 1997 album Deconstructed. The remixed version reached number five on the US Modern Rock Tracks chart. "Mouth" is featured on the soundtrack and in the film An American Werewolf in Paris. The "Mouth" music video features Julie Delpy, who also starred in the film.

20th anniversary reissue
The 20th anniversary of Razorblade Suitcase was marked by a reissue, officially titled Razorblade Suitcase (In Addition). It was released digitally on 16 December 2016, and on vinyl on 10 February 2017. The reissue includes the remastered album and four rare bonus tracks: "Broken TV", "Old", "Sleeper", and "Bubbles". Prior to the reissue, three of the four bonus tracks had been released as B-sides ("Broken TV" with "Swallowed" and "Old" with "Greedy Fly") or found on compilations, but "Sleeper" had never received a proper release. The vinyl release of the reissue is on 180 gram black and white swirl vinyl and comes housed in a metallic silver gatefold cover with re-interpreted artwork, a poster of lyrics (including the songs that weren't on the original), and liner notes from producer Steve Albini.

Critical reception

Reviews for the album were generally mixed, negative, or average. Some critics dismissed the album because they felt that although the band attempted to distance themselves from bands like Nirvana and Pearl Jam in terms of their sound, they ultimately failed at creating a sound of their own. For example, Entertainment Weekly reviewer David Browne stated that some of the songs on the album could have easily been on the record Nirvana never made (due to Kurt Cobain's suicide). Andy Gill from The Independent also stated that portions of the album are very reminiscent of Nirvana, citing songs such as "Swallowed" and "Bonedriven" as irresistible reminders of Nirvana. Rolling Stones Matt Diehl criticized the album at the time of its release, giving the album two out of five stars. Johnny Cigarettes from NME gave the album an extremely negative review, rating it 1/10 "for spelling their name right on the top of the record". However, Razorblade Suitcase was not criticized by all critics. Select magazine gave the effort three out of five stars.

AllMusic's Stephen Thomas Erlewine stated:

"The problem is that Gavin Rossdale has not come up with any hooks, which means that while Razorblade Suitcase is more pleasing and visceral on the surface, it offers no hooks to make it memorable, unlike the hit singles from Sixteen Stone."

Packaging
The album's working title was Ghost Medicine but was changed for unknown reasons. The title Razorblade Suitcase comes from the lyrics of the song "Synapse" and is lead singer Gavin Rossdale's interpretation of "emotional baggage." The album artwork was by Vaughan Oliver and Adrian Philpott. Oliver had previously created the artwork for the Pixies' Surfer Rosa, which was also produced by Steve Albini.

Track listing
All songs written by Gavin Rossdale

"Whatever/History Reprise" (hidden track)
"A Tendency to Start Fires", "Straight No Chaser" and "Synapse" do not appear on the LP version due to time constraints.

PersonnelBush Gavin Rossdale – lead vocals, rhythm guitar
 Nigel Pulsford – lead guitar, backing vocals
 Dave Parsons – bass
 Robin Goodridge – drumsOther musiciansPerry Montague-Mason – violin
Frank Schaefer – cello
Winston – backing vocals
Gavyn Wright – violin Technical personnel'
 Gavin Rossdale – string arrangements
 Nigel Pulsford – arranger, string arrangements
 Steve Albini – engineer, producer
 Tom Elmhirst – assistant engineer
 Paul Hicks – assistant engineer
 Paul Palmer – mixing
 Robert Vosgien – mastering
 Glen Lutchford – photography
 Timothy O'Donnell – design assistant
 Vaughan Oliver – art direction, design
 Adrian Philpott – art direction, design
Gavyn Wright – string arrangements
 David j. Holman – mixing
 Mixed – Cactus Studio Hollywood

Charts

Weekly charts

Year-end charts

Certifications

References

External links
Bush Fansite

Bush (British band) albums
1996 albums
Interscope Records albums
Trauma Records albums
Albums produced by Steve Albini